Nurul Hamira Yusma Mohd Yusri  (born 26 October 1992) is a Malaysian women's international futsal player and footballer who plays as a midfielder. She is a member of the Malaysia women's national football team. She was part of the team at the 2016 AFF Women's Championship. On club level she played for MISC-MIFA in Malaysia.

References

1992 births
Living people
Malaysian women's footballers
Malaysia women's international footballers
Place of birth missing (living people)
Women's association football midfielders
Malaysian women's futsal players